Survive (often styled S U R V I V E) is an electronic band consisting of Michael Stein, Kyle Dixon, Adam Jones and Mark Donica formed in 2009 in Austin, Texas. The Austin-based quartet have been producing synth-heavy, horror-score-influenced compositions for over a decade, exploring these themes through drum machines and analog synths across various single, EP and LP releases and contributions to soundtracks such as acclaimed indie horror film The Guest. The band gained wider fame after members Dixon and Stein composed the musical score for the Netflix's horror-supernatural hit series Stranger Things.

Both volumes of the soundtrack were nominated individually for the Best Score Soundtrack Category for the 2017 Grammy Awards, though neither won. 2017 saw Dixon and Stein also nominated for an ASCAP award as a result of their soundtrack work. In September 2017 Dixon and Stein won the Emmy Award for Outstanding Original Main Title Theme Music for their work on the Stranger Things theme. 2017 has also seen the band curate the music for Sensory, a multi-dimensional immersive restaurant experience' at Sugar Hill Mountain Festival in Melbourne, Australia.

Discography

Albums

Extended plays & tapes

Music videos

References

American electronic musicians